EERC may refer to:
Economics Education and Research Consortium
Educational Enrichment for Romanian Children
Energy and Environmental Research Center
Engineer Enlisted Reserve Corps
Eton Excelsior Rowing Club